Bernd Gerd Rauw (born 8 January 1980) is a Belgian former professional footballer who played as a defender.

References

External links
 

1980 births
Living people
People from Malmedy
Belgian footballers
Association football defenders
Bundesliga players
2. Bundesliga players
3. Liga players
Eerste Divisie players
Alemannia Aachen players
Arminia Bielefeld players
MVV Maastricht players
Kickers Emden players
1. FC Union Berlin players
FC Rot-Weiß Erfurt players
Footballers from Liège Province